Kehinde  Feyi Fatai (born 19 February 1990) is a Nigerian professional footballer who plays as a forward for Romanian club Oțelul Galați.

Club career

Early career & Romanian Liga I 
Fatai was in Nigeria with the Anwar-ul-Islam College and played for JUTH F.C. He left for Europe in July 2007, joining FC Farul Constanța of Romania. Initially, he played in the third league of Romania for the reserve team and scored 11 goals in 20 games. In the following 2008–09 season Fatai was promoted to Farul Constanța's senior team. On 16 June 2010, he signed with Liga I club Astra Giurgiu on a free transfer, after his contract with Farul Constanța had ended.

Club Brugge 
On 1 September 2013, Belgian club Club Brugge confirmed Fatai’s signing on a season long loan from Astra, with an option to buy. On 22 September 2013, he came on for his debut as an 80th-minute substitute and needed only seven minutes to break the deadlock with a shot in Club Brugge's 4-0 win over fierce rivals Anderlecht.

AC Sparta Prague 
In May 2015, Fatai signed for Czech club AC Sparta Prague on a three-year contract.

As a striker, he scored only one goal in eight league matches for Sparta Prague. This bad form in front of goal led to his playing as a wide midfielder instead. After this position change, he went on to score five goals in three matches.

FC Ufa 
On 12 August 2016, he signed a 3-year contract with the Russian Premier League side FC Ufa. He was released from his Ufa contract by mutual consent on 14 August 2018.

Return to Romania
On 23 February 2023, Fatai returned to Romania and signed a contract with Oțelul Galați in Liga II until the end of the 2022–23 season, with an option to extend for one more year.

International career 
Fatai was called up to the Nigeria U-23 team in 2011 for a friendly against Costa Rica. On 4 June he was selected for a qualifying match for the 2012 Summer Olympics against Tanzania.

On 24 October 2015, Fatai said he had promised the Romania national team officials that he would represent Romania on the senior level upon gaining citizenship.

Personal life
Kehinde Fatai's twin brother, Taiye is also a footballer who spent most of his career in the lower leagues of Romania playing for teams like FCM Alexandria or ACS Berceni. Another one of his brothers, Yunus is a footballer who played in the lower leagues of Romania at Astra II and Dacia Unirea Brăila. He has a total of four brothers and a sister.

Career statistics

Club

Honours
Astra Giurgiu
 Supercupa României: 2014

References

External links

1990 births
Nigerian twins
Sportspeople from Jos
Yoruba sportspeople
Romanian people of Nigerian descent
Naturalised citizens of Romania
Living people
Nigerian footballers
Nigeria under-20 international footballers
Association football forwards
JUTH F.C. players
FCV Farul Constanța players
FC Astra Giurgiu players
Club Brugge KV players
AC Sparta Prague players
FC Ufa players
FC Dinamo Minsk players
FC Argeș Pitești players
ASC Oțelul Galați players
FC Turan players
Liga I players
Liga II players
Liga III players
Belgian Pro League players
Czech First League players
Russian Premier League players
Belarusian Premier League players
Kazakhstan Premier League players
Nigerian expatriate footballers
Expatriate footballers in Romania
Nigerian expatriate sportspeople in Romania
Expatriate footballers in Belgium
Nigerian expatriate sportspeople in Belgium
Expatriate footballers in the Czech Republic
Nigerian expatriate sportspeople in the Czech Republic
Romanian expatriate sportspeople in the Czech Republic
Expatriate footballers in Russia
Nigerian expatriate sportspeople in Russia
Romanian expatriate sportspeople in Russia
Expatriate footballers in Belarus
Nigerian expatriate sportspeople in Belarus
Romanian expatriate sportspeople in Belarus
Expatriate footballers in Kazakhstan
Nigerian expatriate sportspeople in Kazakhstan
Romanian expatriate sportspeople in Kazakhstan